Aethes mesomelana is a species of moth of the family Tortricidae. It was described by Francis Walker in 1863. It is found in China (Heilongjiang, Hubei, Liaoning, Shanghai) and Russia (Amur).

References

mesomelana
Moths described in 1863
Moths of Asia
Taxa named by Francis Walker (entomologist)